Collin Brannen Cowgill (born May 22, 1986) is an American former professional baseball outfielder and current major league coach.  He played in Major League Baseball (MLB) for the Arizona Diamondbacks, Oakland Athletics, New York Mets, Los Angeles Angels, and the Cleveland Indians. Prior to his professional career, Cowgill played college baseball for the University of Kentucky. Cowgill was the coach for the Arkansas Travelers, the Double-A affiliate of the Seattle Mariners, and is currently the first base coach for the Cincinnati Reds.

Amateur career
Cowgill attended the University of Kentucky, where he played college baseball for the Kentucky Wildcats baseball team. In his final season at Kentucky, he was named a third-team All-American by Rivals. In 2006, he played collegiate summer baseball in the Cape Cod Baseball League for the Brewster Whitecaps, and returned to the league in 2007 to play for the Yarmouth-Dennis Red Sox where he was named a league all-star.

Professional career

Arizona Diamondbacks
The Arizona Diamondbacks drafted Cowgill in the fifth round of the 2008 Major League Baseball draft from Kentucky.

On July 26, 2011 Cowgill was called up from the AAA Reno Aces.
He hit his first career major league home run as a Diamondback, on August 28, 2011 against the San Diego Padres.

Oakland Athletics
On December 9, 2011, Cowgill was part of a trade along with Jarrod Parker and Ryan Cook, in which the Diamondbacks acquired Trevor Cahill and Craig Breslow from the Oakland Athletics.

New York Mets

On December 18, 2012, the Athletics traded Cowgill to the New York Mets for Jefry Marté.
Cowgill hit the first grand slam for the Mets on Opening Day in 18 years when he hit one in the 7th inning against the San Diego Padres.

Cowgill was named the starting center fielder for the Mets for 2013 after an impressive spring training. After a poor start to the season, Cowgill was set to platoon in center field with Jordany Valdespin. Cowgill was optioned to Triple-A Las Vegas on May 3 when the Mets recalled Andrew Brown. On June 18, 2013, Cowgill was designated for assignment by the Mets.

Los Angeles Angels of Anaheim
On June 24, 2013, the Mets traded Cowgill to the Angels in exchange for minor league outfielder Kyle Johnson. On June 10, 2014, Collin Cowgill hit his first walk-off home run in the bottom of the 14th inning to beat the Oakland A's 2-1.

Cleveland Indians
Cowgill was traded from the Angels to the Cleveland Indians for cash considerations on December 2, 2015. He played in nine games for the Indians, including opening day, before being optioned to the minor league Columbus Clippers. The Indians designated Cowgill for assignment on September 1, 2016 and outrighted him to Columbus on September 2.

Cowgill elected free agency on October 5, 2016.

San Diego Padres
Cowgill signed a minor league contract with the San Diego Padres in 2017, that included an invitation to spring training. He was released on August 12, 2017.

Philadelphia Phillies
On February 8, 2018, Cowgill signed a minor league deal with the Philadelphia Phillies. He elected free agency on November 2, 2018.

Washington Nationals
On February 21, 2019, Cowgill signed a minor league deal with the Washington Nationals. He became a free agent following the 2019 season.

Seattle Mariners
On February 17, 2020, Cowgill signed a minor league deal with the Seattle Mariners. Cowgill became a free agent after the season.

Coaching career

On January 27, 2021, Cowgill was announced as the manager for the Arkansas Travelers, the Double-A affiliate of the Seattle Mariners, effectively ending his playing career.

References

External links

 

1986 births
Living people
Baseball players from Lexington, Kentucky
Major League Baseball outfielders
Arizona Diamondbacks players
Oakland Athletics players
New York Mets players
Los Angeles Angels players
Cleveland Indians players
Kentucky Wildcats baseball players
Brewster Whitecaps players
Yarmouth–Dennis Red Sox players
South Bend Silver Hawks players
Yakima Bears players
Visalia Rawhide players
Mobile BayBears players
Reno Aces players
Bravos de Margarita players
American expatriate baseball players in Venezuela
Sacramento River Cats players
Stockton Ports players
Las Vegas 51s players
Salt Lake Bees players
Inland Empire 66ers of San Bernardino players
Columbus Clippers players
El Paso Chihuahuas players
Arizona League Padres players
Lehigh Valley IronPigs players
Fresno Grizzlies players